Stubborn as a Mule is a 2010 documentary directed by Arcelious Daniels & Miller Bargeron, Jr., which makes the case for reparations for slavery for African Americans.

Awards
Best Diaspora Documentary: 2011 Africa Movie Academy Award, Nigeria, Africa
Best International Film: 2010 Music Video Screen Awards (MVSA), Birmingham, United Kingdom
Best Film on Matters Relating to the Black Experience/Marginalized People: 2011 Black International Cinema, Berlin, Germany
Award of Merit: 2010 Accolade Competition, La Jolla, California
Director's Choice Award: 2010 Portland African-American Film Festival, Portland, Oregon

References

German documentary films
Best Diaspora Documentary Africa Movie Academy Award winners
2010 films
Reparations for slavery
Documentary films about African Americans
Documentary films about United States history
2010 documentary films
2010s German films